Marinobacter santoriniensis is a Gram-negative, facultatively anaerobic, non-spore-forming and motile bacterium from the genus of Marinobacter which has been isolated from hydrothermal sediments in Santorini in Greece. Marinobacter santoriniensis can metabolize arsenate and arsenite.

References

Further reading

External links
Type strain of Marinobacter santoriniensis at BacDive -  the Bacterial Diversity Metadatabase

Alteromonadales
Bacteria described in 2009